Felíx Darío León (born May 2, 1961 in Luque, Paraguay) is a Paraguayan football manager and former Paraguayan footballer who played for clubs of Paraguay, Argentina and Chile.

Teams
  River Plate 1988
  San Lorenzo 1989-1990
  Mandiyú de Corrientes 1990
  Cerro Porteño 1991
  Deportes Antofagasta 1992

References
 
 

1961 births
Living people
Sportspeople from Luque
Paraguayan footballers
Paraguayan football managers
Paraguayan expatriate footballers
River Plate (Asunción) footballers
Cerro Porteño players
San Lorenzo de Almagro footballers
C.D. Antofagasta footballers
Deportivo Mandiyú footballers
Chilean Primera División players
Argentine Primera División players
Expatriate footballers in Chile
Expatriate footballers in Argentina
Association football forwards
12 de Octubre Football Club managers
Sportivo Luqueño managers
Deportivo Santaní managers
Deportivo Capiatá managers